In mathematical logic, the word definable may refer to:

 A definable real number
 A definable set
 A definable integer sequence
 A relation or function definable over a first order structure
 A mathematical object or concept that is well-defined

Mathematics disambiguation pages